

The table below includes 14 sites listed on the National Register of Historic Places in the Borough of Franklin Lakes, New Jersey in Bergen County. Latitude and longitude coordinates of the sites listed on this page may be displayed in a map or exported in several formats by clicking on one of the links in the box below the map to the right.

National Register listings elsewhere in Bergen County may be found in separate articles.

Current listings

|}

References

Franklin Lakes, New Jersey
Franklin